Back to Me is the third studio album by American singer and songwriter Fantasia. It was released on August 24, 2010, by J Records. The album's title was suggested to her by comedian Steve Harvey, when Barrino visited his morning radio program. The album sold 117,000 in its first week, debuting at number two on the US Billboard 200 and at number one on the Billboard R&B/Hip-Hop Albums chart, making it Fantasia's highest charting album as of September 2010.

Background
The album was originally set for release in early 2010, but after an underperforming first single and numerous leaks, J Records ordered more tracks for the album, postponing the album's release until further studio sessions, and stronger singles were recorded. Her label recruited Claude Kelly to add a more contemporary, commercial sound to the album. The project's lead single, "Bittersweet" was released to iTunes on May 11, 2010, and was performed live on American Idol, while a new release date was set for July 27, 2010. The album was again pushed back to August 10, 2010 and finally to August 24, 2010.

To promote the album, Barrino embarked on her first solo concert tour, Back to Me Tour in the fall of 2010.

Singles
 "Even Angels", the album's promotional single, was performed on The Oprah Winfrey Show on February 3, 2010. The single was never promoted after the performance or sent to radio for airplay.  It was later featured on Episode 11 of the third season of RuPaul's Drag Race, as part of RuPaul's "Lip sync for your life" song list, in which Barrino was a guest judge.
 "Bittersweet", the album's first official single, was released on May 11, 2010 and then performed the next day on American Idol. The music video was released on Vevo on June 25, 2010 and featured NFL star Devin Thomas as her love interest. Fantasia was also a guest on BET's 106 and Park on her birthday, June 30, 2010, to premiere the video internationally. The track peaked at number one on the US Billboard Adult R&B Chart, at number seven on the US Billboard Hot R&B/Hip-Hop Songs chart and at number 74 on the US Billboard Hot 100 chart. "Bittersweet" was Fantasia's fourth song to reach the Top 10 of the US Billboard Hot R&B/Hip-Hop Songs chart, including "Truth Is", "Free Yourself", and "When I See U".
"I'm Doin' Me", the second "official" single from the album, debuted at number 97 on the US Billboard Hot R&B/Hip-Hop songs and peaked at number 11.
"Collard Greens & Cornbread" is the third official single from the album. Fantasia performed the song on American Idol's result night on March 31, 2011. The song was officially released as a radio single on April 11, 2011. The song debuted on the Hot R&B/Hip-Hop Songs chart at number 73. The single has since peaked at number 47 on the chart.

Commercial performance
Back to Me sold 117,000 copies in its debut week earning Barrino a number two debut on the US Billboard 200 chart and a total of 490,000 copies as of April 2013. Back to Me topped the Top R&B/Hip-Hop Albums chart. First single "Bittersweet" peaked at number seventy-four on US Billboard Hot 100, number seven on Hot R&B/Hip-Hop Songs and number sixty-six in Japan (Japan Hot 100 chart). It sold 90,000 copies. "I'm Doin' Me" debuted at number ninety-seven on Hot R&B/Hip-Hop Singles, but later peaked at number eleven. It also peaked at number sixty on US Billboard Radio Songs chart, selling 29,000 copies.

Critical response

Upon its release, Back to Me received generally positive reviews from most music critics. At Metacritic, which assigns a normalized rating out of 100 to reviews from mainstream critics, it has so far received an average score of 70 based on 7 reviews.

Ken Capobianco with The Boston Globe called the record "a strong comeback" and went on to say that "Fantasia has matured [and] appears to be an artist reborn." Mariel Concepcion with Billboard called it a "soulful, laid-back album with tinges of gospel" and went on to say "her distinct voice is most enjoyable when singing heartfelt ballads. Jim Farber with The New York Daily News called it "a wail of a comeback". He also said it "outperforms the singer's first two works, with meatier hooks, firmer melodies, and a more shrewdly focused point of view." Mikael Wood with Entertainment Weekly gave it a "B" rating, commenting "Fantasia's rough-hewn vocals shine best on The Thrill Is Gone." Stephen Thomas Erlewine with AllMusic called it her "most interesting album", and commented saying that she was "reconnecting with her roots."

However, Jonathan Keefe of Slant Magazine stated "the material [Fantasia] has been saddled with has been extraordinarily awful" but still described her positively as an "uninhibited, intuitive soul singer with a truly distinctive sense of phrasing and boundless passion".

The album received a Grammy Award nomination for Best R&B Album.

Track listing

Notes
 signifies co-producer
Sample credits
"Collard Greens & Cornbread" contains a sample from "Your Precious Love", performed by Marvin Gaye and Tammi Terrell.
"Move on Me" was previously recorded by girl group RichGirl in 2008 but never officially released.
"Trust Him" contains a sample from "Synthetic Substitution", performed by Melvin Bliss.
"The Thrill Is Gone" contains a sample from "The Look of Love", performed by Isaac Hayes.

Personnel

Chris Athens – mastering
Warren Luening, Larry Hall, Rick Baptist – trumpet
Yelena Yergorian, Josefina Vergara, Tammy Hatwan, Julie Rogers, Katia Popov, Searmi Park, Alyssa Park, Sid Page, Natalie Leggett, Neel Hammond, Henry Gronnier, Caroline Campbell, Charlie Bisharat – violin
Derek Blanks – photography
Jesse Bond, James Harrah – guitar
Stephen Bray, Brenda Russell, Allee Willis – producer
Tanisha Broadwater, Donnie Meadows, Kimberly L. Smith, David "Touch" Wright – production coordination
Robert Brophy, Brian Dembow, Thomas Diener, Alma Fernandez – viola
Ndugu Chancler – drums
Benjamin Chang, Jaymz Hardy-Martin III, Mike "TrakGuru" Johnson, Scott Naughton – engineer
Giovanna Clayton, Steve Erdody, Vanessa Freebairn-Smith, Tim Loo – celli
Los DaMystro – conductor, producer
Bruce Dukov – concertmaster, violin
Warren Felder, Fantasia, Claude Kelly, Tiffany Villarreal, Andrew Wansel – backing vocals
Frank Filipetti, Carlton Lynn, Robert – engineer, mixing
Ashanti "The Mad Violinist" Floyd – cello, viola, violin
Moses Gallart, Jesus Garnica, Chad Jolley, Giancarlo Lino, Conrad Martin, Aaron Walk, Jason Wilkie – assistant
Erwin Gorostiza – creative director
Chuck Harmony – bass, drums, guitar, producer, vocal producer
Dan Higgins, Greg Huckins, Joel Peskin – clarinet
Alex Iles, Bill Reichenbach Jr., Reggie Young – trombone
Jaycen Joshua – mixing
Alphonso Johnson – bass
Jim Jonsin – keyboards, producer, programming
Joseph Joubert – arranger, conductor
Rico Love – producer, vocal producer
Graham Marsh – engineer, vocal engineer
Deaundra Metzger – hair stylist
Joe Mitchell – percussion
Danny Morris – keyboards
Keith Naftaly – A&R
Ne-Yo – producer, backing vocals
Greg Phillinganes – organ, synthesizer
Tony Reyes – bass, guitar
Victor Simonson – piano
Lucky Smyler – make-up
The Stereotypes – engineer, producer
Denise Trotman – art direction, design
Julian Vasquez – vocal engineer
Pamela Watson – stylist
Gina Zimmitti – contractor

Charts

Weekly charts

Year-end charts

References

Fantasia Barrino albums
J Records albums
2010 albums
Albums produced by Chuck Harmony
Albums produced by Jim Jonsin
19 Recordings albums
Albums produced by Ne-Yo
Albums produced by Rico Love
Albums produced by Oak Felder